The Church of Queen of Peace is a Roman Catholic church in Kričke, Croatia.

History 

Construction of church begun in 1989. It was projected by Zadar architect Ivo Sorić.
On 31 May 1990 the church was dedicated. Whole complex consisted of church, pastoral  center, sacristy and sanitary facilities. There was also built bell tower, which was 17 meters high.

On 28 August 1992, during the Croatian War of Independence, the church was mined and damaged by rebel Serbs.

In 1998 and 1999 was built new, today church with new bell tower, which is 28 meters high.

References 

Churches in Croatia
Buildings and structures in Šibenik-Knin County